Emilio Núñez (born Juan Emilio de la Caridad Núñez y Rodriguez on 27 December 1855 in Esperanza, Las Villas, Cuba – 5 May 1922 in Havana, Cuba) was a Cuban-American soldier, dentist, and politician.

Early life and education
Núñez graduated in 1889 from the University of Pennsylvania and was a dental surgeon in Philadelphia.

At an early age, he joined the Cuban Revolutionary Army and fought in the "Guerra de Diez Años" (Ten Years' War) attaining the rank of colonel.  He was captured and imprisoned in El Morro Castle where he escaped, and returned to organize a rebel group to operate in San Diego del Valle until 1880 when José Martí convinced him that Cuban independence was not feasible at the moment. 

Núñez then went into exile where he collaborated closely with Marti and became a naturalized U.S. citizen. From the United States he sent arms, ammunition and food to Cuba as Commander in Chief of the Department of Expeditions until 1885. He became a Major-General in the Cuban War of Independence. He organized armed revolutionary expeditions from the United States.

He was one of 31 delegates in the Cuban Constitutional Convention of 1900. He was the Civil Governor of the Province of Havana from 1899–1902 and was the first person to raise the flag of Cuba at El Morro Castle on May 20, 1902 at noon.

Núñez served as Cuban Secretary of Agriculture, Commerce and Labor in 1913 and as Vice President of Cuba from 1917-1921.

Family
Núñez was the son of Bernardo Núñez y Perez-Labrador and Eulalia Rodriguez y Otero. He was married to Dolores Portoundo y Blez and they had six children: Bernardo (1886–1967), Julia (1888–1974), Maria Estrella (1890–1926), Ricardo (1893–1973), Emilio Núñez Portuondo (1898–1978) and America (1903–1964).
All were born in Philadelphia except America, who was born in Havana.

References

Bibliography
 Nunez-Portoundo, Ricardo, General Emilio Nunez: Un Procer Cubano, Publicaciones Cultural(1994),  
 Paine, Ralph Delahaye, Roads of Adventure, Houghton Mifflin Company (1922)
 Parker, William Belmont, Cubans of To-Day, G. P. Putnam's Sons (1919)

External links

American people of Cuban descent
1855 births
1922 deaths
People from Sagua la Grande
University of Pennsylvania alumni
American dentists
Vice presidents of Cuba